Chapayevo is a rural locality (a village) in Verkhnetroitsky Selsoviet, Tuymazinsky District, Bashkortostan, Russia. The population was 56 as of 2010. There is 1 street.

Geography 
Chapayevo is located 37 km south of Tuymazy (the district's administrative centre) by road. Nizhnetroitsky is the nearest rural locality.

References 

Rural localities in Tuymazinsky District